Laura Catherine Dreyfuss (born August 22, 1988) is an American actress and singer, known for her roles as Zoe Murphy in the Broadway musical Dear Evan Hansen, Madison McCarthy on the FOX musical series Glee and McAfee Westbrook on the Netflix series The Politician.

Life and career 
Dreyfuss earned a BFA in musical theatre from the Boston Conservatory. Dreyfuss was previously cast in the ensemble of the Broadway revival of Hair, then later was a replacement for the main character in the musical, Once.

Dreyfuss originated the role of Zoe Murphy, the love interest of the title character, Evan Hansen, in the Broadway musical Dear Evan Hansen after previously playing the role in both the Arena Stage and Second Stage Theatre productions.  On July 12, 2018 it was announced that Dreyfuss would leave Dear Evan Hansen, with her last show being July 15, 2018. On July 16, 2018 Dreyfuss was announced as a series regular on Ryan Murphy's Netflix series The Politician. On July 26, 2018, Dreyfuss released her debut single "Be Great" under the stage name Loladre.

Acting credits

Awards and nominations

References

External links
 

 
 

21st-century American actresses
21st-century American singers
American television actresses
Actresses from New Jersey
Grammy Award winners
Living people
Singers from New Jersey
1988 births
Boston Conservatory at Berklee alumni
21st-century American women singers
American stage actresses